Margareta Israelsson (born 1954) is a Swedish Social Democratic politician. She has been a member of the Riksdag since 1984.

External links
Margareta Israelsson at the Riksdag website

Members of the Riksdag from the Social Democrats
Living people
1954 births
Women members of the Riksdag
Members of the Riksdag 2002–2006
21st-century Swedish women politicians
21st-century Swedish politicians
20th-century Swedish women politicians
20th-century Swedish politicians